Local Heroes is a science and history television programme in the United Kingdom, presented by Adam Hart-Davis.

Made by Screenhouse Productions and directed by Paul Bader, it was first aired on the ITV regional network Yorkshire Television in 1991. In the show, Adam Hart-Davis, dressed in the pink and yellow cycling clothes that would become the show's trademark, rode around the YTV region (including Yorkshire, Norfolk and Lincolnshire) on a matching pink and yellow bicycle, stopping in a particular area to tell the stories of scientists that lived or were born there. These stories were embellished by experiments, performed on the street by Hart-Davis, generally using bits of wood and junk from a trailer on his bike.

This hobo-meets-Johnny Ball style approach to science-education proved appealing, and after two series, the show was sold to the national BBC2 network in 1994. The move saw two changes: the scope of the show was expanded nationwide, with a different region visited each episode; and the theme tune was changed from No More Heroes by The Stranglers to a twee and plinky number, more in keeping with the programme genre. Eventually this was replaced by a more upbeat theme, by Wallace and Gromit composer Julian Nott, played by a Czech orchestra.

Since then, the series has covered over 200 'heroes', and has seen several special episodes. The first special saw Hart-Davis visit Egypt to investigate ancient heroes, while another took him to Italy for a Renaissance special. Another notable show was the finale of the last series (to date), which was performed in front of a live audience at the Royal Institution, much in the style of the Institution's Christmas Lectures.

The show continued until 2000. Since then, Hart-Davis has moved on to other shows, and the bbc.co.uk Local Heroes pages have now been deleted, suggesting that no further series are planned.

Series 1

	South West:
		Sarah Guppy: patented the exercise bed, the breakfast urn and the suspension bridge
		William Watts: invented lead shot
		Humphry Davy: discovered laughing gas, started electrochemistry and made patients breathe gases from cows
		Edward Jenner: introduced vaccination against smallpox
		Mikael Pedersen: designed a beautiful and curious bicycle
		George Pocock (inventor): inventor of spanking machine and pioneer of kite locomotion
	South:
 John Milne: founder of modern seismology
		Edward Lyon Berthon, who invented the folding lifeboat
		Florence Nightingale
		Colin Pullinger
		John Stringfellow:		
	Scotland:
		Charles Piazzi Smyth
		Joseph Black
		John Napier
		David Brewster
		David Douglas
		Gilbert D. Malloch (1881–1955)
		Nevil Maskelyne
		Charles Hutton
	Midlands:
		John Barber (engineer): patented the gas turbine
		Matthew Boulton: host of the Lunar Society, a gathering of scientists
		William Withering: made heart cure from foxgloves (digitalis)
		William Murdoch: invented gas lighting
		James Watt: invented the copying machine and greatly improved steam engines
		Dennis Gabor: invented the hologram on a tennis court – before it was possible to make one
		Alexander Parkes: produced plastics, two generations ahead of their time
		Frederick W. Lanchester: built the first all-British four-wheel petrol-driven car
	Northern Ireland:
John Boyd Dunlop: invented the pneumatic tyre
William Coppin: invented the diving suit and pioneered salvage operations
		George Garrett (inventor): invented a submarine, powered by steam and called Resurgam
		John Getty McGee: invented the Ulster overcoat (as worn by Sherlock Holmes)
		John Thomas Romney Robinson: invented the cup anemometer and measured the position of Armagh with rockets
		Harry Ferguson: pioneered the modern tractor system
	North West:
               John Mackereth: invented the pneumatic mud corer (Mackereth corer) for taking samples from lake beds
		John Gough (natural philosopher): blind naturalist who could identify any plant by taste and touch
		Thomas Edmondson: inventor of the railway ticket
		John Dalton: meteorologist and pioneer of atomic theory
		James Prescott Joule: devised modern ideas about heat
		Joseph Whitworth: revolutionised engineering by defining standard screw threads

Series 2
1	Devon: Isambard Kingdom Brunel:
		Henry Moule:
		Thomas Savery:
		Mary Anning:

2	Scotland: Alexander Bain (inventor): Electro-chemical telegraph
		Charles Macintosh: Mac
		James Clerk Maxwell:
		Robert Stirling: Inventor
		James Gregory (mathematician): Mathematician

3	East: William Harvey: Reformed incorrect thinking about the circulation of blood.
		Robert Fitzroy: Pioneered storm warning system and invented the weather forecast.
Benjamin Wiseman: Patented a Windmill in 1783.
		William Hase: Modified prison treadmills to take power outside the prison.
		William Gilberd: Discovered the earth is a magnet.
		John Jeyes: Invented a unique three-function toilet cleaner Jeyes Fluid.
		William Hyde Wollaston: Invented a clever mirror-and-prism device (Camera lucida) that lets you see your subject superimposed on your sketch pad.

4	North East: 	John Walker (inventor): Invented the friction match.
Charles Algernon Parsons: Invented the steam turbine.
		Joseph Wilson Swan: Invented the incandescent light bulb.
		Lewis Fry Richardson: Inventor of sonar and the understanding of the mathematics of the weather.
		Thomas Wright (astronomer): First to understand the Milky Way.
		Gladstone Adams: Invented the windscreen wiper.

5	Wales: Thomas Telford: Developed a system for road building & built bridges.
Alfred Russel Wallace: Devised theory of natural selection jointly with Darwin.
		William Price (physician): Pioneer of cremation.
		Harry Grindell Matthews: Invented a portable radio, and supposed Death Ray inventor.
		Richard Trevithick: Ran world's first steam locomotive at Merthyr.
		Robert Recorde: Invented equals sign.
		Hugh Owen Thomas (and the bonesetters of Anglesey): Four generations of bonesetters and founder of
		orthopaedic surgery.

6	South East: 
Samuel Morland: Invented giant megaphones and was master mechanic to Charles II
Hertha Ayrton: Invented way of clearing trenches of Mustard Gas.
		Eleanor Coade: Her artificial stone was used for many landmarks.
		Henry Maudslay: Founder of precision engineering and first production line.
		Thomas Young (scientist): Discovered how the eye works and translated the Rosetta Stone.
		Liborio Pedrazzoli: Inventor of swimming umbrellas.
		Ralph Wedgwood (inventor): Invented carbon paper.
		William Willoughby Cole Verner: Invented cavalry sketching board to enable cavalrymen to make accurate maps whilst on horseback.

Series 3

1 Devon and Cornwall: Thomas Newcomen et al.

2 London: Cornelius Drebbel et al.

3 South: Robert Hooke et al.

4 Special – Egypt

5 Special – Italy

6 Special – Science Week

Series 4

1 South:  Henry Cavendish et al.

2 East of Scotland: James Dewar et al.

3 Cotswolds: William Henry Fox Talbot et al.

4 St Pauls: Heroines

BBC television documentaries about history
ITV (TV network) original programming